Arthit Sunthornphit (born April 19, 1986), simply known as Bas, is a Thai professional footballer who plays as a midfielder for Thai League 3 club Phitsanulok. Arthit is left-footed and is a free kick specialist.

International career

Arthit was a member of the victorious T&T Cup 2008 winning squad.

Arthit was part of Winfried Schäfer's squad in the 2012 AFF Suzuki Cup.

International

International goals

Honours

Club
Chonburi
 Thailand Premier League: 2007
 Kor Royal Cup: 2008, 2009

Khon Kaen United
 Thai League 3: 2019
 Thai League 3 Upper Region: 2019

Lamphun Warriors
 Thai League 2: 2021–22

Phitsanulok
 Thai League 3 Northern Region: 2022–23

International
Thailand U-23
 Sea Games Gold Medal: 2007

Thailand
 T&T Cup: 2008

References

External links
 
 Profile at Goal

1986 births
Living people
Arthit Sunthornpit
Arthit Sunthornpit
Association football midfielders
Arthit Sunthornpit
Arthit Sunthornpit
Arthit Sunthornpit
Arthit Sunthornpit
Arthit Sunthornpit
Arthit Sunthornpit
Southeast Asian Games medalists in football
Arthit Sunthornpit
Competitors at the 2007 Southeast Asian Games